The 1896 Republican National Convention was held in a temporary structure south of the St. Louis City Hall in Saint Louis, Missouri, from June 16 to June 18, 1896.

Former Governor William McKinley of Ohio was nominated for president on the first ballot with 661½ votes to 84½ for House Speaker Thomas Brackett Reed of Maine, 61½ votes for Senator Matthew S. Quay of Pennsylvania, 58 votes for Governor Levi P. Morton of New York who was vice president (1889–1893) under President Benjamin Harrison. New Jersey banker Garret A. Hobart was nominated for vice president over Henry Clay Evans of Tennessee. Joseph B. Foraker of Ohio placed McKinley's name in nomination.

The convention was originally slated for the St. Louis Exposition and Music Hall. However it was determined that repairs and upgrading the Hall could not be done in time and so a temporary wood convention hall was built in 60 days at a cost of $60,000 on the lawn south of City Hall which was under construction. At the conclusion of the convention, both the temporary building as well as the original Exposition Hall were torn down and a new Coliseum was built.

The 1896 Convention was held in St. Louis less than a month after the infamous 1896 tornado that devastated a large swath of the city and killed at least 255 people. There was speculation that it might be unfeasible to hold the convention in the city, but, after a concerted cleanup effort was undertaken, the convention went ahead as planned.

Platform 
The Republican platform of 1896 favored the gold standard but left the door open to free coinage of silver, it also supported acquisition of Hawaii and parts of the Danish West Indies, favored a canal across Central America, naval expansion, sympathized with revolutionaries in Cuba and Armenia, wanted exclusion of all illiterate immigrants, applauded gains in women's rights and pledged "equal pay for equal work". It also supported creation of a "National Board of Arbitration".

Presidential nomination

Presidential candidates 

Presidential Balloting / 3rd Day of Convention (June 18, 1896)

Vice Presidential nomination

Vice Presidential candidates 

For a running mate, McKinley had preferred Speaker Thomas B. Reed, with whom he had worked for many years in the House, but Reed
would accept only the top spot on the ticket.

Coming into the convention, former Vice President Levi P. Morton had strong support to re-take his former office from delegates who favored the gold standard. However, McKinley's manager, Mark Hanna opposed Morton's addition to the ticket, instead favoring Garret A. Hobart or Minnesota Senator Cushman Kellogg Davis. Though McKinley's camp did not strongly oppose the party's gold standard platform, Hanna feared that the nomination of Morton would cause silver Republicans such as Colorado Senator Henry M. Teller to bolt the party. Hanna was ultimately successful at keeping Morton off the ticket, but many silver Republicans nonetheless supported the Democratic ticket of William Jennings Bryan and Arthur Sewall.

Vice Presidential Balloting / 3rd Day of Convention (June 18, 1896)

See also 
 History of the United States Republican Party
 List of Republican National Conventions
 U.S. presidential nomination convention
 1896 United States presidential election
 1896 Democratic National Convention
 McKinley at Home, Canton, Ohio
 William McKinley presidential campaign, 1896

References

Bibliography 

 Official Proceedings of the Eleventh Republican National Convention; Held in the City of St. Louis, Mo., June 16, 17, and 18, 1896

External links 
 Republican Party platform of 1896 at The American Presidency Project

1896 United States presidential election
Republican National Conventions
1896
Political conventions in Missouri
1896 in Missouri
1896 conferences
June 1896 events
Conventions in St. Louis